The 2003 Women's National Invitation Tournament was a single-elimination tournament of 32 NCAA Division I teams that were not selected to participate in the 2003 Women's NCAA tournament. It was the sixth edition of the postseason Women's National Invitation Tournament (WNIT).

In the championship game, Auburn defeated host Baylor by a score of 64–63 to capture their first WNIT title.

References

Women's National Invitation Tournament
Women's National Invitation Tournament
Women's National Invitation Tournament
Women's National Invitation Tournament